Atrilinea macrops is a species of cyprinid in the genus Atrilinea that inhabits Dayaoshan, China.

References

Cyprinidae
Freshwater fish of China
Cyprinid fish of Asia